High Season for Spies is a 1966 Eurospy film directed by Julio Coll and starring Antonio Vilar, Letícia Román and Peter van Eyck. It was made as a co-production between Portugal, Spain and West Germany. The film's action takes place around Lisbon, and concerns attempts by various secret agents to steal a formula.

Plot 
In Lisbon, Professor Zandor developed a groundbreaking formula on behalf of the industrialist Bardot: He succeeded in producing a steel mixture that is completely bulletproof and, as a result, makes conventional weapons ineffective. In doing so, he gets all kinds of agents from different countries on their toes, but also crooks who are not only after the formula for the fantastic alloy, but also after Professor Z himself. One day, the brilliant scientist is kidnapped straight from his laboratory, and those present, Ellen Green, Zandor's assistant, and Mr. Bardot himself, are witnesses. Zandors client now fears that the groundbreaking formula could be leaked to a foreign power. The most important nations then send their best people to the Portuguese capital, including Jack Haskins from the USA and Pierre Genet from France. Both men have known each other for some time and sometimes cooperate, but have also appeared as competitors.

The events have led to the fact that now Lisbon is not only a fairground for spies, but also various dark figures arrive on site, including a certain Johannsson, the head of a gang, as well as the opaque Jenny Renoir and the unscrupulous killer Peterson. Local Commissioner Oliveira has his hands full to ensure that his Lisbon does not turn into a battlefield anytime soon. France's agent Genet finds out how dangerous Johannsson is when, on arrival, he barely escapes an attack by Johannsson's men and is saved thanks to Haskins' mission. Haskin receives the first trace of Zander through a letter he discovers in Ellen's handbag. He is in danger himself, but cannot track down the professor. A splendid party that Bardot is hosting one evening brings everyone involved together for the first time: Haskins, Genet, Johannsson, Ellen Green, Jenny Renoir, Commissioner Oliveira and Mike Danham, a Bardot employee. In the course of the evening, Bardot becomes the victim of a sophisticated assassination attempt. Haskins and Genet discover clues that suggest a connection between the murder and knowledge of the formula of the invention. They also find out that an affair is simmering between Bardot's wife and Danham. Haskins confronts the two and coaxes them to admit that Mike is Bardot's killer. Before Haskins can find out more about the crime, the couple is shot by Johannsson.

The gang boss flees headlong, and a wild chase ensues, in which Haskins takes Johannsson. Haskins and his French colleague use a ruse to determine the true role of Ellen Green: She is her British colleague, the agent from London, and was smuggled into Zander's environment as his assistant. She is behind the "kidnapping" of Zander in order to actually protect him from the villains. Johannsson manages to free himself and, with the help of his people, to determine Zandors whereabouts. However, Ellen Green escapes in a car with her protégé, the professor. However, Johannsson's people deposited a time bomb there. Johannsson's men pursue the refugees. Professor Zandor is fatally shot in the chase. For their part, Haskins and Genet chase after Johannsson. They manage to save Ellen just in time from the car exploding. However, they cannot find the formula. Apparently the professor destroyed them beforehand. And so the military balance of terror is preserved.

Cast
 Antonio Vilar as Pierre Genet / Dick
 Letícia Román as Ethel / Ellen Green
 Peter van Eyck as Kramer / Jack Haskins
 Américo Coimbra as Mike Danham / João
 Mikaela as Anne Bardot
 Artur Semedo as Mr. Bardot
 Klausjürgen Wussow as Johansson / Bonnard
 Corny Collins as Jenny Renoir
 Ricardo Rubinstein as Kommissar Oliveira
 José Cardoso as Professor Zandor
 Ricardo Valle as Agent Andrade
 Frank Braña
 Antonio Pica
 Mario Barros as Bob
 Hermann Greegh as Peterson
 Richard Wall as Antonio

References

Bibliography
 Peter Cowie & Derek Elley. World Filmography: 1967. Fairleigh Dickinson University Press, 1977.

External links

1966 films
West German films
Portuguese thriller films
Spanish spy thriller films
1960s spy thriller films
German spy thriller films
1960s German-language films
Films set in Lisbon
Constantin Film films
1960s German films